The W. O. Decker is a 52 foot wooden tugboat built in Long Island City in 1930 as the Russell I for the Newtown Creek Towing Company.    The Decker tugboat company on Staten Island bought and renamed the boat in 1946.  She was originally steam powered before being refitted with a 175 hp diesel engine.  In 1986, she was donated to the South Street Seaport Museum in Manhattan, where she remains today under restoration.  She was added to the National Register of Historic Places on September 13, 1996.

References

External links

South Street Seaport Museum: W.O. Decker

Ships on the National Register of Historic Places in Manhattan
1930 ships
South Street Seaport
Tugboats of the United States
Museum ships in New York (state)